Cohors quarta Gallorum equitata ("4th part-mounted Cohort of Gauls") was a Roman auxiliary cohort containing both infantry and cavalry contingents. It was probably raised in Gallia Lugdunensis at the time of the founder-emperor Augustus (30 BC – 14 AD). It is first attested in Moesia in 75 AD and was still in Moesia Inferior in 105. It therefore probably took part in the emperor Trajan's Dacian Wars (99–106). After a brief stay in Thracia (where it is attested in 114), it was transferred to Britannia not later than 122. Its last datable attestation is in 276-82 at Vindolanda. But the Notitia Dignitatum, a late Roman official document, records a cohors IV Gallorum at Vindolanda under the dux Britanniarum, the commander of limitanei (border forces) along Hadrian's Wall. The Western section of the Notitia was drawn up in the 420's but the British units must date to before 410, when the island was evacuated by the Roman army.

In Britannia, the regiment was stationed in various forts. In the 3rd century it is attested, from 213 onwards, in the fort at Vindolanda (Chesterholm) on Hadrian's Wall, but the regiment's inscriptions have also been found, undatable, at Risingham, Templeborough, Castlehill, Castlesteads and High Rochester. According to Holder, the sequence was Castlehill 144–60, Risingham 160–80 and then at Vindolanda. Castlehill was a fort on the Antonine Wall in Caledonia (Scotland) that was held for only 20 years by the Romans.

The names of ten praefecti (regimental commanders) are preserved, of which the origin of just one is certain: Quintus Petronius Urbicus from Brixia (Brescia) in northern Italy. Of the common ranks, the origin of just one is known: an Illyrian eques (common cavalryman), C. Iulius Valens of the Tralli tribe, attested in 114.

See also 
 List of Roman auxiliary regiments

Citations

References 
 Holder, Paul Studies in the Auxilia of the Roman Army (1980)
 Holder, Paul Bulletin of the John Rylands Library 79 (1997)
 Spaul, John COHORS 2 (2000)

Military of ancient Rome
Auxiliary equitata units of ancient Rome